{{DISPLAYTITLE:C24H32O5}}
The molecular formula C24H32O5 (molar mass: 400.51 g/mol, exact mass: 400.2250 u) may refer to:

 Estriol dipropionate, or estriol 3,17β-dipropionate
 Marinobufagenin
 Mexrenone

Molecular formulas